Thomas Wiegand (born 6 May 1970 in Wismar) is a German electrical engineer who substantially contributed to the creation of the H.264/AVC, H.265/HEVC, and H.266/VVC  video coding standards. For H.264/AVC, Wiegand was one of the chairmen of the Joint Video Team (JVT) standardization committee that created the standard and was the chief editor of the standard itself. He was also a very active technical contributor to the H.264/AVC, H.265/HEVC, and H.266/VVC video coding standards. Wiegand also holds a chairmanship position in the ITU-T VCEG of ITU-T Study Group 16 and previously in ISO/IEC MPEG standardization organizations. In July 2006, the video coding work of the ITU-T jointly led by Gary J. Sullivan and Wiegand for the preceding six years was voted as the most influential area of the standardization work of the CCITT and ITU-T in their 50-year history. Since 2018, Wiegand has served as chair of the ITU/WHO Focus Group on Artificial Intelligence for Health (FG-AI4H). Since 2014, Thomson Reuters named Wiegand in their list of “The World’s Most Influential Scientific Minds” as one of the most cited researchers in his field.

Current work
Wiegand is Professor at the Technical University of Berlin and executive director of the Fraunhofer Heinrich Hertz Institute, Berlin, Germany. He heads research teams working on
 Video processing and coding
 Multimedia transmission
 Machine learning
 Mobile Communications (management)
 Computer Vision (management)

Since 2020 he is a Principal Scientist at the Berlin Institute for the Foundations of Learning and Data (BIFOLD).

Early background
Thomas Wiegand was born in and spent his early life in East Germany, where he decided to make an apprenticeship as an electrician instead of studying, because everyone who wanted to go to the university had to serve for three years in the National People's Army which he chose to avoid. After the "Wende" he started to study electrical engineering at the Technical University of Hamburg, where he earned his Diplom in 1995. In 2000 he earned his Ph.D. at the University of Erlangen-Nuremberg. As a student, he was a Visiting Researcher at Kobe University, Japan, the University of California at Santa Barbara and Stanford University, USA, where he also returned as a visiting professor.

Standardization
 Since 2000: Associated Rapporteur of VCEG (Video Coding Experts Group - ITU-T SG16 Q.6)
 Since 2001: Associated Rapporteur / Co-Chair of JVT
 Since 2002: Editor of the H.264/AVC video coding standard and its extensions (FRExt and SVC)
 2005-2009: Associated Chair of MPEG Video (Moving Pictures Experts Group - ISO/IEC JTC1/SC29/WG11)
 Since 2018: Chair of the ITU/WHO Focus Group on Artificial Intelligence for Health (FG-AI4H)

Awards
 1998: SPIE VCIP Best Student Paper Award (together with Eckehard Steinbach, Peter Eisert and Bernd Girod)
 2004: Fraunhofer Award (together with Detlev Marpe and Heiko Schwarz) 
 2004: ITG Award of the German Society for Information Technology (together with Detlev Marpe and Heiko Schwarz)
 2006: The video coding work of the ITU-T led by Gary Sullivan and Thomas Wiegand jointly since 2000 was voted as the most influential area of the standardization work of the CCITT and ITU-T in their 50-year history
 2008: Primetime Emmy Engineering Award (awarded to the JVT standards committee by the Academy of Television Arts and Sciences for development of the High Profile of H.264/MPEG-4 AVC, for which Wiegand served as associated rapporteur/co-chair, editor, and technical contributor)
 2009: Paired Technology & Engineering Emmy Awards (one awarded to VCEG and one to MPEG by the National Academy of Television Arts and Sciences for development of the H.264/MPEG-4 AVC standard)
2009: Group Technical Achievement Award of EURASIP (European Association for Signal Processing) for active contributions to video coding research and standardization activities
2009: Best Paper Award of IEEE Transactions on Circuits and Systems for Video Technology (together with Heiko Schwarz and Detlev Marpe)
2009: Innovation Award of Vodafone Foundation for Research in Mobile Communications
2010: Technology Award of Eduard Rhein Foundation (together with Jens-Rainer Ohm)
2011: Fellow of the IEEE for contributions to video coding and its standardization
2011: Best Paper Award of EURASIP (European Association for Signal Processing) (together with Karsten Müller, Aljoscha Smolic, Kristina Dix, Philipp Merkle and Peter Kauff)
2011: Karl Heinz Beckurts Award (together with Heiko Schwarz and Detlev Marpe)
2012: IEEE Masaru Ibuka Consumer Electronics Award - IEEE Technical Field Award
2013: Best Paper Award of IEEE Transactions on Circuits and Systems for Video Technology (together with Gary Sullivan, Jens-Rainer Ohm, and Woo-Jin Han)
2013: Best Journal Paper Award of the IEEE Communications Society MMTC (together with Patrick Ndjiki-Nya, Martin Koppel, Dimitar Doshkov, Haricharan Lakshman, Philipp Merkle and Karsten Müller)
2013: International Multimedia Telecommunications Consortium (IMTC) Leadership Award
2013: Research Award for Technical Communication of Alcatel Lucent Foundation
2014: Best Paper Award of EURASIP (European Association for Signal Processing) (together with P. Merkle, Y. Morvan, A. Smolic, D. Farin, K. Müller and P.H.N. de With)
2014: Richard Theile Medal of the German Television and Cinema Technology Society
2015: ITU150 Award (the other ITU 150 awards went to Bill Gates, Robert E. Kahn, Mark I. Krivocheev, Martin Cooper, and Ken Sakamura)
2016: Elected member of the German National Academy of Engineering (Acatech)
2017: Primetime Emmy Engineering Award (awarded to the JCT-VC standards committee of VCEG and MPEG by the Academy of Television Arts and Sciences for development of the H.265/MPEG-H HEVC standard, for which Wiegand served as associated rapporteur of VCEG and technical contributor)
2018: Elected member of the German National Academy of Sciences (Leopoldina)
2019: Best Poster Presentation Paper Award, Picture Coding Symposium, Ningbo, China (PCS 2019) (together with Wang-Q Lim, Heiko Schwarz, Detlev Marpe)
2022: EURASIP Best Paper Award for the Signal Processing: Image Communication Journal (together with R. Reisenhofer, S. Bosse, G. Kutyniok)
2022: Fellow of the Information Technology Society in VDE (ITG) 2022, for his "outstanding achievements in the field of communications and information technology, noted by the entire professional community, in conjunction with [his] commitment to our professional society."

Other positions held
 1993–1994: Visiting Researcher, Kobe University, Japan
 1995: Visiting Scholar, University of California at Santa Barbara, U.S.
 1997–1998: Visiting Researcher, Stanford University, California, USA 
 1997–1998: Consultant to 8x8 Inc., Santa Clara, California, USA
 2006–2011: Member of technical advisory board, Vidyo, Inc., Hackensack, New Jersey, USA
 2006–2008: Member of technical advisory board, Stream Processors, Inc., Sunnyvale, California, USA
 2007–2009: Consultant, Skyfire, Inc. (acquired by Opera Software ASA), Mountain View, California, USA
 2011–2012: Visiting Professor, Stanford University, USA

External links

References 

1970 births
Living people
People from Wismar
People from Bezirk Rostock
Engineers from Mecklenburg-Western Pomerania
University of Erlangen-Nuremberg alumni
Academic staff of the Technical University of Berlin
Fellow Members of the IEEE
Members of the German Academy of Sciences Leopoldina
Primetime Emmy Engineering Award winners